Benjamin Homans  was an American merchant captain, and politician who served as the 4th Massachusetts Secretary of the Commonwealth and who served from as the Chief Clerk of the Navy Department, which was at the time the second highest civilian position in the US Navy.

Early career
Homans had been a merchant captain during the 1780s and 1790s. During the Quasi war with France, because of the Sedition Act and because he was an ardent Jeffersonian, Homans went into exile in Bordeaux.

War of 1812
Prior to the 1814 British attack, and Burning of Washington during the War of 1812, it was Homans, along with Dolley Madison who removed two wagon loads of the Navy Department's archives; including saving Charles Willson Peale's classic portrait of George Washington.

Notes

External links

1823 deaths
Secretaries of the Commonwealth of Massachusetts
19th-century American people
United States Navy civilians